Scolochloa is a genus of grasses in the family Poaceae / Gramineae, now containing a single species, Scolochloa festucacea. Common rivergrass is a common name for the species. Scolochloa festucacea grows in Europe, temperate Asia, and North America.

The genus formerly included a second species, Scolochloa arundinacea, which is now placed in the genus Arundo as Arundo donax.

References 

Pooideae
Grasses of the United States
Grasses of Canada
Monotypic Poaceae genera